Predrag Koraksić Corax (born 15 June 1933) is a Serbian political caricaturist.

Name signature
He writes his signature Corax using Latin characters and spelling.

Biography
Koraksić was born on 15 June 1933 in Gornja Gorevnica, near Čačak. His parents are Stojan and Zorka (née Borić), who were teachers. His father, who was also one of the Partisan Movement leaders, was killed during the World War II by Chetniks in 1941. Corax spent four years as a refugee.

After the war Corax graduated from the grammar school in Zemun and studied architecture in Belgrade, but dropped out in his third year of studies. Corax started his professional cartoonist career in 1950 in newspaper Jež. Afterwards, Corax worked for Večernje novosti, from which he was expelled after the court process in 1993.

Since 1989, Corax worked for the independent newspaper Borba, but moved to Danas, where he still works, when Borba was taken over by the Serbian government. From 1990 until 2005 he was working for magazine Vreme, where he was a member of the editorial board.

Cartoons
Corax's cartoons are humorous accounts of contemporary, mostly Serbian, political events. He rarely uses any written text in his cartoons, but relies on caricatures of politicians for the message be self-explanatory. His strips are currently being published frequently by Serbian newspaper Danas.

He is a prominent cartoonist in Serbia, as his cartoons are published in well known publications and his style is easily recognized. He also published several books, among which are: the "Past Continuous Tense" and the "Phenomenon of Rusty Spoon", covering political life in Serbia from 1990 to 2016 in caricatures form. For his works he said that throughout his career: "(he) took care that the caricature should not offend anyone, not to be excessive, not to insult, but to be ridicule, irony, that a person laughs". Commenting on inspiration for making cartoons about politicians, he said: "I've been always driven mad by arrogance, which is actually a dominant characteristic of those people, ruthlessness, lies, deceit... and especially nationalism."

Throughout career, his sarcastic cartoons about politicians have made a bunch of high-ranking officials of Serbia offended, that they even publicly criticized his work (in pretty negative way). Among them, most notable are at the time of Presidents of Yugoslavia Dobrica Ćosić, Slobodan Milošević and Vojislav Koštunica, and in recent years President of Serbia Aleksandar Vučić. From time to time, political leaders have also tried to obstruct his work following the provocative cartoons aimed at them, by replacing main editors in newspapers where he works or by cancelling his art exhibitions in public libraries without proper explanation.

Awards
In October 2004, he was rewarded French Légion d'honneur. In December 2017, he was awarded with "Dobar primer Novog Optimizma" award.

Personal life
Koraksić is married to Branislava (née Galić), with whom he has two children - Tatjana and Uroš.

References

External links
 Corax works at pescanik.net 
 Corax books at delfi.rs 

1933 births
Living people
People from Čačak
Serbian cartoonists
Serbian caricaturists
Recipients of the Legion of Honour